The 1913 Tufts Jumbos football team was an American football team that represented Tufts University as an independent during the 1913 college football season. The team compiled a 7–1 record and outscored opponents by a total of 174 to 22. Charles Whelan was the team's head coach.

Schedule

References

Tufts
Tufts Jumbos football seasons
Tufts Jumbos football